WBMP may refer to:

 Wireless Application Protocol Bitmap Format, a graphics file format
 WINS-FM, a radio station (92.3 FM) licensed to New York City, United States, known as WBMP from 2014 to 2018